Cycle one of Canada's Next Top Model, the Canadian adaptation of Tyra Banks' America's Next Top Model, aired on Citytv from May to July 2006. The show was hosted by Canadian model and actress Tricia Helfer, who also served the role of head judge with a judging panel composed of columnist and designer Jeanne Beker, former model Stacey McKenzie, and make-up artist Paul Venoit. The creative director of America's Next Top Model, Jay Manuel also made guest appearances in the cycle, and later went on to host the show for its next two seasons. The cycle's catchphrase was "Now it's our turn."

The winner of the competition was 19-year-old Andrea Muizelaar from Whitby, Ontario.

Cast

Contestants
(Ages stated are at start of contest)

Judges
 Tricia Helfer (host)
 Jeanne Beker
 Paul Venoit
 Stacey McKenzie

Other cast members
Sima Kumar

Episodes

Results

 The contestant was eliminated
 The contestant won the competition

Average call-out order
Final two are not included.

Bottom two

 The contestant was eliminated after her first time in the bottom two
 The contestant was eliminated after her second time in the bottom two
 The contestant was eliminated after her third time in the bottom two
 The contestant was eliminated in the final judging and placed as the runner-up

Photo shoot guide
Episode 1 photo shoot: Iconic women of rock
Episode 2 photo shoot: Fight Club
Episode 3 photo shoot: Cars & diamonds are a girls best friend
Episode 4 photo shoot: Lingerie and topless
Episode 5 photo shoot: Lady of the manor with a falcon
Episode 6 photo shoot: Pantene beauty campaign
Episode 7 photo shoot: 80's workout
Episode 8 photo shoot & commercial: Fashion magazine covers, CoverGirl

Makeovers 
Dawn – Layered with bangs 
Natalie – Long blonde weave with bangs
Heather – Cut short  with brown highlights
Tenika – Long chocolate brown extensions and eyebrows shaped
Ylenia – Trimmed with highlights
Brandi – Straightened
Sisi – Extra shine
Alanna – Bob cut and dyed chestnut red
Andrea – Long dark red hair extensions intended; later, pixie cut

Aftermath
After winning the competition, Muizelaar appeared on the cover of Canadian wedding magazine SPOSA, which also included a spread. She appeared in CoverGirl campaign ads and also did a publicity mall tour after the show's finale, mostly at Sears stores, but four months after the winning, Muizelaar announced she was leaving the modeling world.

Muizelaar initially stated that modeling was "not the best thing out there". It was eventually revealed that it was due to her struggles with anorexia, noting that there was pressure to remain skinny, as she was often told "how good [she] looked at [her] skinniest". Ever since leaving modeling, she started to gain back the weight she lost during her eating disorder days. Additionally, although she initially stated that she booked most of the jobs she went for, she then stated that winning the show actually brought her few opportunities, and also noted that the winnings were subject to income tax.

References

2006 Canadian television seasons
Canada's Next Top Model
Television shows filmed in Victoria, British Columbia